A non-binding referendum on introduction of the euro was held in Sweden on 14 September 2003.  The majority voted not to adopt the euro, and thus Sweden decided in 2003 not to adopt the euro for the time being. Had they voted in favour, the plan was that Sweden would have adopted the euro on 1 January 2006.

The ballot text was "Do you think that Sweden should introduce the euro as currency?". Sweden in Europe was the main umbrella group campaigning for a Yes vote. The No vote campaign was led by two organisations, representing left and right wing politicians respectively. The political parties were divided, with the Centre Party, Left Party and Green Party being against, and the Moderates, Christian Democrats and Liberal People's Party being for. The Social Democrats did not take a position due to internal disagreements.

Background

Sweden joined the European Union in 1995 and its accession treaty has since obliged it to join the euro. However, one of the requirements for eurozone membership is two years' membership of ERM II, and Sweden has chosen not to join this mechanism and as a consequence tie its exchange rate to the euro ±2.25%. While there is government support for membership, all parties have pledged not to join without a referendum in favour of doing so.

Results

The voter turnout was 82.6%, and the result was 55.9% against and 42.0% in favour. A majority of voters in Stockholm voted in favour of adopting the euro (54.7% "yes", 43.2% "no"). In Scania and Stockholm counties the "yes" votes (49.3%) outnumbered the "no" votes (48.5%), although the invalid and blank votes resulted in no majority for either option. In all other parts of Sweden, the majority voted no. Among municipalities, a majority of those in western Scania, and in Stockholm, voted yes. Kungsbacka and Haparanda also voted "yes". All other municipalities voted "no".

Source: NationalencyklopedinSee also: Swedish Election Authority

See also

 Sweden and the euro
 Reaction to murder of Anna Lindh
 Referendums in Sweden

Notes

References

Referendums in Sweden
Sweden
Sweden and the European Union
Referendums related to the European Union
2003 in Sweden
Euro by country
September 2003 events in Europe
2003 in the European Union